Cyclone is a multidirectional helicopter game for the ZX Spectrum released by Vortex Software in 1985. It was written by Vortex co-founder Costa Panayi who also coded the similarly styled Tornado Low Level.

Gameplay
The player controls a rescue helicopter and must retrieve five supply crates containing essential medical supplies from a collection of 14 islands, while a dangerous cyclone is in the area.

While searching for the missing crates, the player may optionally earn bonus points by rescuing refugees from the islands. There is no limit on the number of crates or refugees the helicopter can carry, and the player only needs to return to Base Island after the last crate has been found and loaded.

Hindering progress is the cyclone itself, which can cause the helicopter to behave erratically at long range, and crash at close range. The position and progress of the cyclone can be monitored on the map enabling the player to determine when to vacate the area or when to carry out an emergency landing. While over open water the helicopter must avoid low flying planes which traverse the screen occasionally. The player also has limited fuel which can be replenished at helipads on several of the islands, and a time limit in which to retrieve the crates.

The game screen is split into 2 areas, the main environment and the head-up display (HUD) that surrounds it. The heads up display contains instrumentation which includes speed, altitude, fuel remaining and time remaining. Additionally there is also information on the number of supply crates, whether the player's current view is North or South, information on wind force and a warning to the player of the cyclone's proximity and any approaching planes.

The 3D aspect of the game allows the helicopter to not only move on the x-axis (left/right on screen) and the y-axis (up/down on screen), but also on the z-axis, representing its height in the sky. Lowering the helicopter's height while directly above a crate or refugee automatically triggers the winch which pulls them up to safety. The helicopter casts a shadow which also helps with the illusion of 3 dimensions and gives an visual of your height. The graphics support this 3D environment in the form of cliffs, other terrain, buildings etc. The game also features an interesting game mechanic - the view has two aspects of North and South to switch between. This allows the player to view the environment from the two different angles, essential as some crates are hidden behind buildings or terrain so can only be seen from North or South. There is also a map view to help locate the cyclone and the islands.

Once completed the game loops, with no change in difficulty.

Development

Reception

Following on from the success of Tornado Low Level, Cyclone met favourable reviews again praising the 3D visuals, however there were some reviewers that believed that these 3D visuals were actually a downgrade  The gameplay itself was again met favourably with some reviews pleased with Cyclone's main focus - the departure from the "attack" gameplay of Tornado Low Level, and the move towards rescue based gameplay. But again there were some disagreements with the gameplay, with some claiming that there was not enough difference from its predecessor Tornado Low Level. It is clear from the reviews that the game was in direct comparison with its predecessor which may have affected the way it was received.

References

External links

1985 video games
Helicopter video games
Multidirectional shooters
Video games developed in the United Kingdom
Vortex Software games
ZX Spectrum games
ZX Spectrum-only games